The Brazil women's national water polo team represents Brazil in international women's water polo competitions and friendly matches.

Results

Olympic Games

Olympic Year Tournament
 1996 – 12th place

World Championship

 1991 – 8th place
 1994 – 11th place
 1998 – 10th place
 2001 – 10th place
 2003 – 12th place
 2005 – 13th place
 2007 – 10th place
 2009 – 13th place
 2011 – 14th place
 2013 – 14th place
 2015 – 10th place
 2017 – 14th place
 2022 – 14th place

FINA World Cup
 1991 – 8th place

FINA World League

 2014 – 8th place
 2015 – 8th place
 2016 – 8th place

Pan American Games

UANA Cup (ASUA Cup)

 2011 –  Silver medal
 2013 –  Silver medal
 2015 –  Silver medal
 2019 –  Bronze medal

Team

Current squad
Squad for the 2017 World Aquatics Championships.

Head coach: Eduardo Abla

Former squads

 1999 Pan American Games –  Bronze Medal
Ana Monteiro, Antonella Bertolucci, Camila Pedrosa, Cláudia Graner, Cristiana Pinciroli, Cristina Beer, Mariana Fleury, Mariana Secches, Mariana Roriz, Mariangela Corrêa, and Raquel Maizza.
 2003 World Championship – 12th place
Marina Canetti, Viviane Costa, Flávia Fernandes, Cláudia Graner, Andréa Henriques, Mayla Siracusa, Maria Marques, Tess Oliveira, Rubi Palmieri, Camila Pedrosa, Mariana Resstom, Mariana Roriz, and Melina Teno. Head Coach: David Hart.
 2003 Pan American Games –  Bronze Medal
Viviane Costa, Andréa Henriques, Camila Pedrosa, Cláudia Graner, Flávia Fernandes, Mariana Roriz, Maria Marques, Marina Canetti, Mayla Siracusa, Melina Teno, Tess Oliveira, Rubi Palmieri, and Ana Vasconcelos.
 2005 World Championship – 10th place
Ciça Canetti, Manuela Canetti, Marina Canetti, Luiza Carvalho, Viviane Costa, Flávia Fernandes, Andréa Henriques, Fernanda Lissoni, Amanda Oliveira, Tess Oliveira, Camila Pedrosa, Melina Teno, and Ana Vasconcelos.
 2007 World Championship – 10th place
Ciça Canetti, Manuela Canetti, Marina Canetti, Luiza Carvalho, Viviane Costa, Flávia Fernandes, Andréa Henriques, Fernanda Lissoni, Amanda Oliveira, Tess Oliveira, Camila Pedrosa, Melina Teno, and Ana Vasconcelos. Head Coach: Roberto Ghiappini.
 2007 Pan American Games – 4th place
Amanda Oliveira, Maria Bárbara Amaro, Ana Vasconcelos, Andréa Henriques, Camila Pedrosa, Ciça Canetti, Fernanda Lissoni, Flávia Fernandes, Luiza Carvalho, Manuela Canetti, Marina Canetti, Melina Teno, and Tess Oliveira.
 2008 FINA Olympic Qualifying Tournament – 11th place
 Tess Oliveira, Luiza Jordi, Flávia Fernandes, Marina Canetti, Marina Zablith, Carolina Melo, Amanda Oliveira, Luiza Carvalho, Fernanda Lissoni, Flavia Vinha, Maria Bárbara Amaro, Gabriela Mantelato, and Cláudia Graner. Head Coach: Roberto Chiappini.
 2011 Pan American Games –  Bronze Medal
Tess Oliveira, Ciça Canetti, Marina Zablith, Marina Canetti, Catherine de Oliveira, Izabella Chiappini, Cristina Beer, Luiza Carvalho, Fernanda Lissoni, Gabriela Gozani, Mirela Coutinho, Gabriela Dias, and Manuela Canetti.
 2015 Pan American Games –  Bronze Medal
Tess Oliveira, Marina Zablith, Izabella Chiappini, Catherine Oliveira, Luiza Carvalho, Mirella Coutinho, Gabriela Dias, Diana Abla, Marina Canetti, Lucianne Maia, Melani Dias, Viviane Bahia, and Victoria Chamorro. Head Coach: Patrick Oaten

Under-20 team
Brazil lastly competed at the 2021 FINA Junior Water Polo World Championships.

See also
Brazil men's national water polo team

References

CBDA

Women's national water polo teams
 
Water polo